Andrew A. Pinson (born 1985/1986) is an American lawyer from Georgia who was appointed as an associate justice of the Georgia Supreme Court. He served as a judge of the Georgia Court of Appeals from 2021 to 2022.

Education 

Pinson received a Bachelor of Business Administration in Finance summa cum laude from the University of Georgia and his Juris Doctor summa cum laude from the University of Georgia School of Law. While at Georgia Law, he served as Executive Articles Editor for the Georgia Law Review.

Legal career 

Pinson served as a law clerk to judge David Sentelle of the United States Court of Appeals for the District of Columbia and then to associate justice Clarence Thomas of the United States Supreme Court. Pinson was a lawyer at Jones Day in Atlanta where he served in the issues and appeals practice. He then went on to be the deputy solicitor general and later solicitor general of Georgia, taking office on September 16, 2018, after the elevation of Sarah Hawkins Warren to the Supreme Court.

Judicial career

Court of appeals 
Pinson was sworn in as a judge of the Georgia Court of Appeals on August 31, 2021, after being appointed by governor Brian Kemp, becoming one of the youngest members at age 35.

Supreme Court 
In July 2021, Pinson was one of six candidates under consideration for appointment to the Supreme Court following the retirement of justice Harold Melton, the seat was eventually filled by Verda Colvin. On February 14, 2022, the governor appointed Pinson to be an associate justice of the Georgia Supreme Court following the resignation of David Nahmias July 17, 2022. He was sworn into office on July 20, 2022. Pinson will be succeeded by Ben Land on the court of appeals.

See also 
 List of law clerks of the Supreme Court of the United States (Seat 10)

References

External links 
 Appearances at the U.S. Supreme Court from the Oyez Project
 

|-

|-

1980s births
Living people
21st-century American lawyers
21st-century American judges
Georgia Court of Appeals judges
Georgia (U.S. state) lawyers
Jones Day people
Justices of the Supreme Court of Georgia (U.S. state)
Law clerks of the Supreme Court of the United States
Solicitors General of Georgia
University of Georgia alumni
University of Georgia School of Law alumni